The Cooper 367 is a Canadian sailboat that was designed by Stan Huntingford as a cruiser and first built in 1984.

The boat is a development of the 1979 Cooper 353, with a longer length overall and greater displacement and ballast.

Production
The design was built by Cooper Enterprises in Port Coquitlam, British Columbia, starting in 1984, but the company went out of business in 1990 and it is now out of production.

Design
The Cooper 367 is a recreational keelboat, built predominantly of fibreglass. It has a masthead sloop rig, a skeg-mounted rudder and a fixed fin keel. It displaces  and carries  of ballast.

See also
List of sailing boat types

References

Keelboats
1980s sailboat type designs
Sailing yachts
Sailboat type designs by Stan Huntingford
Sailboat types built by Cooper Enterprises